Nordsee-Treene is an Amt ("collective municipality") in the district of Nordfriesland, in Schleswig-Holstein, Germany. Its seat is in Mildstedt. It was formed on 1 January 2008 from the former Ämter Friedrichstadt (except the town Friedrichstadt), Hattstedt, Nordstrand and Treene.

The Amt Nordsee-Treene consists of the following municipalities:

Ämter in Schleswig-Holstein